Tom Bauchop (born 1978), best known by his stage name U.N.P.O.C., is a Scottish musician and member of the Fence Collective. He has released two albums on Domino Records, Fifth Column and the limited edition Live at King Tut's. Fifth Column featured only two musicians: Bauchop, and drummer Stu Bastiman.

In 2007, his single Here on My Own was used in both the theatrical trailer and film, Hallam Foe; the film went on to win the award for "Best Music" at that year's Berlin Film Festival. The song was also used to soundtrack the theatrical trailer for the 2007 Golden Horse Film Festival in Taipei, Taiwan.

Discography

Albums
Fifth Column (2003)
Live at King Tut's (2004)

Singles
"Amsterdam" / "Here on My Own" (2003)

External links
Official website
U.N.P.O.C. at Domino Records
Article on U.N.P.O.C. in ''Uncut magazine

References 

Living people
1978 births
21st-century British singers